This is a list of Canadian actors/actresses who are First Nations, Métis or Inuit.

A
 Evan Adams, Coast Salish
 Allakariallak, Inuit
 Nathaniel Arcand, Plains Cree
 Gerald Auger, Woodland Cree

B
 Adam Beach, Saulteaux
 Tanaya Beatty, Awaetlatla 
 Rykko Bellemare, Atikamekw
 Kwena Bellemare-Boivin
 Morris Birdyellowhead, Paul First Nation 
 Ryan Rajendra Black
 Ta'Kaiya Blaney, Tla'amin Nation
 Cherish Violet Blood, Kainai
 Columpa Bobb, Tsleil-Waututh
 Sonia Boileau, Mohawk
 Tina Louise Bomberry, Mohawk  
 Eugene Brave Rock, Kainai
 Joe Buffalo, Cree

C
 Ashley Callingbull, Cree
 Lorne Cardinal, Cree
 Tantoo Cardinal, Cree, Métis
 Shirley Cheechoo, Cree
 Byron Chief-Moon
 Robbi Chong, partly Cherokee
 George Clutesi, Tseshaht

D
 Dan George, Tsleil-Waututh
 Darrell Dennis, Shuswap
 Grace Dove, Shuswap

F
 Meegwun Fairbrother, Ojibwe
 Gary Farmer, Cayuga
 Waawaate Fobister, Ojibwe 
 Cree Summer Francks, Plains Cree (adopted) 
 Rainbow Sun Francks, Plains Cree (adopted)

G
 Cara Gee, Ojibwe
 Chief Dan George, Salish – nominated for an Academy Award for Best Supporting Actor, Little Big Man
 Glen Gould, Mi'kmaq
 Graham Greene, Oneida - nominated for an Academy Award for Best Supporting Actor, Dances with Wolves
 Douglas Grégoire, Innu
 Yamie Grégoire, Innu
 Michael Greyeyes, Plains Cree
 Max Gros-Louis, Huron-Wendat

H
 Dakota Ray Hebert, Dene
 Jimmy Herman, Dene, Chipewyan 
 René Highway, Cree
 Zoe Hopkins, Heiltsuk, Mohawk
 Kaniehtiio Horn, Mohawk 
 Dakota House, Cree
 Duane Howard, Nuu-chah-nulth

I
 Johnny Issaluk, Inuit
 Madeline Ivalu, Inuit
 Paul-Dylan Ivalu, Inuit

J
 Tom Jackson, Cree, Métis - known for his role of Billy Twofeathers on Shining Time Station and Peter Kenidi on North of 60
 Kawennáhere Devery Jacobs, Mohawk

K
 Jean-Luc Kanapé, Innu
 Margo Kane, Cree, Saulteaux 
 Tina Keeper, Cree
 Kiawentiio, Mohawk
 Asivak Koostachin, Cree/Inuk

L
 Anna Lambe, Inuit
 Tina Lameman, Cree
 Craig Lauzon, Ojibwe
 Jani Lauzon, Ojibwe, Cree
 George Leach, Lillooet 
 Phillip Lewitski, Mohawk
 Cody Lightning, Cree
 Crystle Lightning, Cree
 Georgina Lightning, Cree
 Kevin Loring, Nlakapamuk 
 Wendy Lumby, Swan Lake

M
 Cheri Maracle, Mohawk
 Gail Maurice, Métis
 Sera-Lys McArthur, Nakota/Assiniboine Pheasant Rump Nakota First Nation
 Glen Meadmore
 Andrea Menard, Metis
 Billy Merasty, Cree
 Steven Cree Molison, Cree/Métis
 Carmen Moore

N
Violet Nelson, Kwakwakaʼwakw
Jacques Newashish, Atikamekw
Paul Nutarariaq, Inuit, Ojibwe, Cree

O
Brandon Oakes, Mohawk
Joshua Odjick, Algonquin
Joel Oulette, Cree/Métis

P 
 Bronson Pelletier, Cree 
 Wilma Pelly, Saulteaux
 Tahmoh Penikett, White River First Nation
 Jennifer Podemski, Saulteaux, Métis
 Tamara Podemski, Saulteaux, Métis

R
 Paul Rabliauskas, Anishinaabe
 Justin Rain, Cree
 Duke Redbird, Ojibwe
 Alex Rice, Mohawk

S
 Samian, Abitibiwinni 
 Buffy Ste. Marie,  Cree
 August Schellenberg, Mohawk, Métis  
 Eric Schweig, Inuvialuit, Chippewa, Dene
 Marika Sila, Inuvialuit
 Jay Silverheels, Mohawk - known for his role of Tonto on The Lone Ranger 
 Bernard Starlight, Tsuutʼina Nation 
 Michelle St. John, Cree 
 Roseanne Supernault, Cree/Métis

T
 Elle-Máijá Tailfeathers, Blackfoot-Sami
 Michelle Thrush, Cree
 Gordon Tootoosis, Cree, Stoney - best known for his role of Albert Golo on North of 60
 Billy Two Rivers, Mohawk

U
 Natar Ungalaaq, Inuit

W
 Jacob Whiteduck-Lavoie, Algonquin

See also
List of Native American actors (U.S. actors)
Indian Actors Association
Indian Actors Workshop

References

 
 
Indigenous
Actors